Kasper Skaanes (born 19 March 1995) is a Norwegian professional footballer who plays for Brann, as a midfielder.

Career statistics

Club

References

1995 births
Living people
Association football midfielders
Norwegian footballers
SK Brann players
IK Start players
Eliteserien players
Norwegian First Division players
Footballers from Bergen